Herbert Runge (23 January 1913 – 11 March 1986) was a German heavyweight boxer. He won the gold medal at the 1936 Summer Olympics in Berlin.

He was born in Elberfeld, which later became part of Wuppertal, where he died as well.

Amateur career 
Runge's biggest success was his gold medal at the 1936 Summer Olympics in Berlin. He also won three medals at the European Amateur Boxing Championships (silver in 1934 and 1937 and bronze in 1939). In addition to that, he is an eight-time German amateur champion (1935–1939, 1941–1943), as well as two-time runner-up to Hein ten Hoff in 1940 and 1944.

1936 Summer Olympics 
1st round: bye
2nd round: Rudolf Kus (Czechoslovakia), knock-out in Round 1
Quarter-final: Anthony Stuart (Great Britain), won on points
Semi-final: Ferenc Nagy (Hungary), walkover, due to injury
Gold medal bout: Guillermo Lovell (Argentina), won on points

Professional career 
Runge had an unsuccessful professional career that spanned from 1946 to 1949. Of 25 bouts, he won 5 (1 KO), drew 6 and lost 13 with one ending in a no contest (or 14 losses and no NC, sources are unclear).

Commemoration 
Still standing today is Runge's Olympic oak tree, that was given to every German 1936 Olympic champion to plant themselves as part of Nazi propaganda and Olympic legacy. It stands just outside the away section of Wuppertal's Stadion am Zoo football stadium, home to former Bundesliga club Wuppertaler SV.

A commemorative plaque with the inscription,

"Olympia-Eiche [Olympia-oak]Herbert Runge*23.01.1913  + 11.03.1986WuppertalOlympiasieger Berlin 1936 [Olympic champion Berlin 1936]Boxen Schwergewicht [Boxing Heavyweight]",

has been attached to the stadium fence in front of the tree in 1999.

References

External links
 

1913 births
1986 deaths
People from Elberfeld
Heavyweight boxers
Olympic boxers of Germany
Boxers at the 1936 Summer Olympics
Olympic gold medalists for Germany
Olympic medalists in boxing
German male boxers
Medalists at the 1936 Summer Olympics
Sportspeople from Wuppertal